Henry Caldwell  (c. 1735–1810) was a Canadian army officer.

Henry Caldwell may also refer to:

Henry Clay Caldwell (1832–1915), United States federal judge and Union Army officer
Henry John Caldwell (1801–1858), Quebec politician
Henry M. Caldwell, Mayor of Birmingham, Alabama in 1878
Sir Henry Caldwell, 2nd Baronet (died c. 1726), of the Caldwell baronets
Sir Henry John Caldwell, 7th Baronet (1801–1858), of the Caldwell baronets

See also
John Henry Caldwell, (1826–1902)  US Representative from Alabama
Harry Handley Caldwell, (1873–1939) American's first submarine captain